Josh Richard Grispi (born October 14, 1988) is an American former professional mixed martial artist. A professional competitor from 2006 until 2014, he has competed for the UFC and WEC.

Background
Grispi, a talented hockey player, was kicked out of many schools and even a paintball facility before venturing into mixed martial arts when he was 13 years old, following the advice of his father. Grispi went to South Shore Sportfighting. The sport grew on Grispi, and he began fighting in New Hampshire and Massachusetts, winning local tournaments while often being the youngest competitor.

Mixed martial arts career

World Extreme Cagefighting
After beginning his career in 2006 and going 10-1 in smaller promotions, Grispi was signed by the WEC.

He made his promotional debut against Mark Hominick at WEC 32, locking in a rear-naked choke submission in the first round. This was followed up by an early first round TKO victory over Micah Miller.

His next fight came against former UFC Lightweight Champion Jens Pulver at WEC 41 on June 7, 2009. He won the fight via guillotine choke submission 33 seconds into the fight. Two days before the Pulver fight, Grispi injured his ankle while training, but agreed to fight anyway. He underwent surgery and returned in the summer of 2010.
 
Grispi returned after a year off to face LC Davis on June 20, 2010 at WEC 49. Grispi submitted Davis by guillotine choke submission at 2:33 of the first round, earning Submission of the Night honors.

Ultimate Fighting Championship
Grispi was expected to face Erik Koch on November 11, 2010 at WEC 52. However, in October 2010, World Extreme Cagefighting merged with the Ultimate Fighting Championship. As part of the merger, all WEC fighters were transferred to the UFC.

He was expected to fight José Aldo at UFC 125 for the UFC Featherweight Championship but Aldo was forced to withdraw due to injury. Risking his #1 contender status, Grispi instead fought late replacement Dustin Poirier at the event and lost via unanimous decision. Grispi suffered a jaw injury in the fight which sidelined him for 5 months.

Grispi faced George Roop on June 4, 2011 at The Ultimate Fighter 13 Finale. He lost the fight via TKO in the third round.

Grispi was expected to face Matt Grice on October 8, 2011 at UFC 136.  However, Grispi was forced from the bout and replaced by Nam Phan.

Grispi was expected to face Pablo Garza on August 4, 2012 at UFC on FOX 4.  However, Garza was forced out of the bout and replaced by Rani Yahya. Grispi lost to Yahya after he tapped out to a north–south choke in the first round.

Grispi faced Andy Ogle on February 16, 2013 at UFC on Fuel TV: Barão vs. McDonald. Grispi lost the fight via unanimous decision and was subsequently released from the promotion.

Post-UFC career
After serving his sentence in jail, Grispi has returned to the mixed martial arts and was expected to face Bruce Boyington for NEF Lightweight Championship at NEF 42 on February 8, 2020. However on January 20, 2020, news surfaced that Grispi was forced to withdraw from the bout due to legal complications and was replaced by Manny Bermudez.

Personal life
Grispi filed for divorce while incarcerated and has a son and a daughter with ex wife Kaitlyn. He is a distant relative of legendary boxer Rocky Marciano. Aside from fighting, Grispi used to do construction work with his father.

Legal Issues
On August 6, 2014, Grispi was held without bail on domestic abuse and assault charges against his wife. Grispi had first been arrested on August 1, 2014, and charged with multiple counts of improperly storing firearms near minors, as well as assault and battery on his wife. However, Grispi was released on August 4, 2014, after posting $2,000 bail.  That same day, Grispi allegedly assaulted his wife again by punching and kicking her repeatedly, as well as sending his bull terrier dog who had been trained to attack her after her. However, his wife was able to escape and reach a neighbor's house to receive help. The neighbor then called police to report the assault.  The police searched Grispi's house and found 20 marijuana plants and 15 grams of cocaine. Grispi's wife told police her husband had been abusive to her for the past two years in their three-year marriage. One officer described the event as "the worst case of domestic abuse I've ever seen." On June 16, 2017, Grispi was convicted on 25 of 29 charges in Plymouth County Superior Court in Brockton, Massachusetts. He received a sentence of  years of incarceration and 5 years of probation upon release. Several charges, such as witness intimidation and witness tampering, related to behavior while incarcerated and awaiting trial, were added.

Championships and accomplishments
World Extreme Cagefighting
Submission of the Night (One time) vs. LC Davis (technical guillotine choke)

Mixed martial arts record

|-
| Loss 
| align=center| 14–5
| Andy Ogle
| Decision (unanimous)
| UFC on Fuel TV: Barão vs. McDonald
| 
| align=center| 3
| align=center| 5:00
| London, England, United Kingdom
| 
|-
| Loss
| align=center| 14–4
| Rani Yahya
| Submission (north/south choke)
| UFC on Fox: Shogun vs. Vera
| 
| align=center| 1
| align=center| 3:15
| Los Angeles, California, United States
| 
|-
| Loss
| align=center| 14–3
| George Roop
| TKO (body punch)
| The Ultimate Fighter 13 Finale
| 
| align=center| 3
| align=center| 3:14
| Las Vegas, Nevada, United States
| 
|-
| Loss
| align=center| 14–2
| Dustin Poirier
| Decision (unanimous)
| UFC 125
| 
| align=center| 3
| align=center| 5:00
| Las Vegas, Nevada, United States
| 
|-
| Win
| align=center| 14–1
| LC Davis
| Technical submission (guillotine choke)
| WEC 49
| 
| align=center| 1
| align=center| 2:33
| Edmonton, Alberta, Canada
| 
|-
| Win
| align=center| 13–1
| Jens Pulver
| Submission (guillotine choke)
| WEC 41
| 
| align=center| 1
| align=center| 0:33
| Sacramento, California, United States
| 
|-
| Win
| align=center| 12–1
| Micah Miller
| TKO (punches)
| WEC 35: Condit vs. Miura
| 
| align=center| 1
| align=center| 0:50
| Las Vegas, Nevada, United States
| 
|-
| Win
| align=center| 11–1
| Mark Hominick
| Technical submission (rear-naked choke)
| WEC 32: Condit vs. Prater
| 
| align=center| 1
| align=center| 2:55
| Rio Rancho, New Mexico, United States
| 
|-
| Win
| align=center| 10–1
| Spencer Paige
| KO (head kick)
| FFP: Untamed 18
| 
| align=center| 1
| align=center| 0:11
| Plymouth, Massachusetts, United States
| 
|-
| Win
| align=center| 9–1
| Paul Gorman
| Submission (triangle choke)
| FFP: Untamed 14
| 
| align=center| 1
| align=center| 2:29
| Plymouth, Massachusetts, United States
| 
|-
| Win
| align=center| 8–1
| Glen Medeiras
| KO (punches)
| RF: Domination
| 
| align=center| 1
| align=center| 0:40
| Concord, New Hampshire, United States
| 
|-
| Win
| align=center| 7–1
| Charlie Murphy
| Submission (armbar)
| WFL 16: Moment of Truth 2
| 
| align=center| 1
| align=center| N/A
| Revere, Massachusetts, United States
| 
|-
| Win
| align=center| 6–1
| Fernando Bernandino
| Decision (majority)
| FFP: Untamed 10
| 
| align=center| 3
| align=center| 5:00
| Plymouth, Massachusetts, United States
| 
|-
| Win
| align=center| 5–1
| Edward Odquina
| Submission (armbar)
| WFL 15: Winter Brawl 2007
| 
| align=center| 1
| align=center| 1:11
| Revere, Massachusetts, United States
| 
|-
| Loss
| align=center| 4–1
| Henrique Bilcalho
| Submission (heel hook)
| CZ 19: Above and Beyond
| 
| align=center| 1
| align=center| 1:32
| Revere, Massachusetts, United States
| 
|-
| Win
| align=center| 4–0
| Eddie Felix
| TKO (punches)
| FFP: Untamed 8
| 
| align=center| 1
| align=center| 0:49
| Mansfield, Massachusetts, United States
| 
|-
| Win
| align=center| 3–0
| Cylde Ganthier
| KO (punches)
| WFL 12: Calloway Cup 3
| 
| align=center| 1
| align=center| N/A
| Revere, Massachusetts, United States
| 
|-
| Win
| align=center| 2–0
| Dan Bonnell
| Submission (guillotine choke)
| CZ 18
| 
| align=center| 1
| align=center| 0:27
| Revere, Massachusetts, United States
| 
|-
| Win
| align=center| 1–0
| Nick Zimmerman
| TKO (punches)
| RF: Invasion
| 
| align=center| 1
| align=center| 0:18
| Manchester, New Hampshire, United States
|

See also
List of male mixed martial artists

References

External links

Official UFC Profile

American male mixed martial artists
Mixed martial artists from Massachusetts
Featherweight mixed martial artists
Ultimate Fighting Championship male fighters
1988 births
Living people
People from Rockland, Massachusetts
People convicted of domestic violence
Sportspeople from Plymouth County, Massachusetts